Governor Dunn may refer to:

David Dunn (Maine politician) (1811–1894), 18th Governor of Maine
Thomas Dunn (lieutenant-governor) (1729–1818), Governor General of British North America from 1805 to 1807
Winfield Dunn (born 1927), 43rd Governor of Tennessee

See also
Edward Fitzsimmons Dunne (1853–1937), 24th Governor of Illinois